José Vega may refer to:

 José Vega (politician), Peruvian politician
 Jose Vega (fighter) (born 1985), American mixed martial artist
 José Vega (Spanish footballer) (born 1981), Spanish footballer
 José Vega (Ecuadorian footballer)
 José Vega Santana (born 1958), Puerto Rican clown, also known as "Remi"
 José Antonio Rodríguez Vega (1957–2002), Spanish serial killer
 José Chico Vega, Puerto Rican New Progressive Party politician
 José G. Tormos Vega (born 1925), Puerto Rican politician
 José Luis Vega (born 1948), Puerto Rican poet
 Joseph de la Vega (1650–1692), Spanish-Dutch merchant
 Cheo Feliciano (1935–2014), artist name of Puerto Rican composer and singer Jose Luis Feliciano Vega
 Sergio Vega (singer) (1969–2010), stage name of Mexican banda singer José Sergio Vega Cuamea
 José Vega (cyclist) (born 1987), professional road racing cyclist from Costa Rica